Long Lama is a town in Marudi District, Sarawak state in Malaysia. The town is located at 143 km from Miri with a population of 1,500.

Etymology
The name of the town is taken from a nearly river named "Lama" that joins into the Baram river. The word "Long" is a Kayan word that means "old", so "Long Lama" means "old river".

History
The Chinese first set foot in this town between 1905 to 1910 and built several shophouses for trading.

Climate
Long Lama has a tropical rainforest climate (Af) with heavy to very heavy rainfall year-round.

References

Marudi District
Towns in Sarawak